František Bolček (27 January 1920 – 3 January 1968) was a Slovak footballer, who played for FC Spartak Trnava in the 1930s and 1940s, as well as for the Army team OAP Bratislava during a WW II period. 

Bolček made 13 appearances for the Slovakia national football team from 1939 to 1944, scoring 5 goals.

References

External links 

 

1920 births
1968 deaths
Slovak footballers
Slovakia international footballers
FC Spartak Trnava players
Association football forwards
Czechoslovak footballers